Francisco Salvador-Daniel (Bourges 17 February 1831 - Paris 24 May 1871) was a French composer and ethnomusicologist of Spanish origin.

Biography 
His father was a Spanish musician of Jewish origin who came to France as a refugee. After studies at the Paris Conservatory of Music, Francisco Salvador-Daniel became a violin teacher at Algiers in 1853. He transcribed and translated songs from North Africa, and adapted them for western instruments. After his return to Paris, he was music critic for La Lanterne, the satirical magazine of Henri Rochefort. During the Commune of Paris, he became director of the Conservatoire and was executed by the "Versaillais" royalists during the final "Semaine sanglante" (Bloody Week) of the Commune.

Works 
 Musique et instruments de musique du Maghreb, La Boîte à documents, 1986 2-906164-00-3
 The Music and musical instruments of the Arab: with introduction on how to appreciate Arab music, by Francesco Salvador-Daniel, edited with notes, memoir, bibliography and thirty examples and illustrations, by Henry George Farmer, translation of : La musique arabe, ses rapports avec la musique grecque et le chant grégorien, Londres, W. Reeves, 1914
 La musique arabe, ses rapports avec la musique grecque et le chant grégorien, Alger, Adolphe Jourdan, 1879 lire en ligne
 Cours de plain-chant, dédié aux élèves-maîtres des écoles normales primaires, by Salvador Daniel (father and son), Paris, P. Dupont, 1864

Recordings
 5 songs in French on Amel chante la Méditerranée - Amel Brahim-Djelloul (soprano), Ensemble Amedyez, Rachid Brahim-Jelloul. AmeSon 2009

References

Bibliography
Stefano A. E. Leoni, "L’Orientalismo eclettico di Francisco Salvador-Daniel, musicista, ricercatore e comunardo: una prima ricognizione", in Studi Urbinati 81, 2011, pp. 289–302

External links
 

Musicians from Bourges
1831 births
1871 deaths
French music critics
Ethnomusicologists
Conservatoire de Paris alumni
Academic staff of the Conservatoire de Paris
Directors of the Conservatoire de Paris
Executed French people
People executed by France by firing squad
Executed people from Centre-Val de Loire
19th-century journalists
Male journalists
19th-century French male writers
French male non-fiction writers
19th-century musicologists